Elektra (minor planet designation: 130 Elektra) is a large outer main-belt asteroid and quadruple system with three minor-planet moons. It was discovered on 17 February 1873, by astronomer Christian Peters at Litchfield Observatory, New York, and named after Electra, an avenger in Greek mythology.

Description 

(130) Elektra has the spectrum of a G-type asteroid; hence it probably has a Ceres-like surface. Spectral signatures of organic compounds have been seen on Elektra's surface and it displays evidence of aqueous alteration.

In the late 1990s, a network of astronomers worldwide gathered lightcurve data that was ultimately used to derive the spin states and shape models of 10 new asteroids, including (130) Elektra. The light curve of (130) Elektra forms a double sinusoid while the shape model is elongated and the derived rotation axis is perpendicular to the plane of the ecliptic.

Optical observations have found three satellites of this asteroid. Once the orbits are known, Elektra's mass can be reliably found. The value of 6.6× kg indicates a density of  Optical observations have also determined that Elektra's shape is quite irregular, as well as giving indications of albedo differences of 5–15% on its surface.

Occultations 

Elektra has been observed to pass in front of a dozen stars since 2007, most notably on 21 April 2018 when over 30 mostly citizen astronomers spread across five European countries recorded the sudden drop in light of an 11th magnitude star. The sky-plane plot of the chords reveals a peanut-shaped body, possibly the result of a two-body merger early in the history of the Solar System.

Satellites 
Elektra has three orbiting natural satellites, all of which are unnamed and measure a few kilometres across. Together with the primary body Elektra, they comprise a quadruple system. Given their similar spectra, these satellites are thought to be fragments of Elektra that were created from a disruptive impact. , Elektra has the most satellites of any main-belt asteroid, and is the only known quadruple asteroid system in the Solar System. All three satellites are faint and orbit closely to Elektra, which makes them difficult to observe due to Elektra's bright glare obscuring them. The largest telescopes with adaptive optics systems and advanced image processing techniques are required for detailed study of the satellites' properties.

S/2003 (130) 1 

It was discovered on 15 August 2003, by a team of astronomers led by W. J. Merline using the Keck II telescope at the Mauna Kea Observatory in Hawaii. The discovery images showed that the satellite had an apparent magnitude difference of 8.5 in the near-infrared K-band. The team confirmed the existence of the satellite after reobserving it with the Keck II telescope on 17 August 2003. The discovery was announced on that same day and the satellite was given the provisional designation .

 orbits  from Elektra with a period of 5.3 days. Its orbit has a moderate eccentricity of 0.08 and an inclination of 160° with respect to the celestial equator. Near-infrared observations from December 2014 show that  along with  display a similar spectrum to Elektra, supporting the hypothesis that they are fragments from a disruptive collision.

S/2014 (130) 1 

 is the second satellite of Elektra by distance and order of discovery. It was discovered on 6 December 2014, by a team of astronomers led by B. Yang using the SPHERE adaptive optics system on the Very Large Telescope's Melipal (UT3) telescope at Cerro Paranal, Chile. Discovery observations showed that the satellite had a near-infrared magnitude difference of 10, corresponding to a diameter of about  if it has the same albedo as the primary.

 orbits  from Elektra with a period of 1.2 days—about two and a half times closer and four times quicker than the outer satellite  Its roughly-circular orbit is inclined 156° with respect to the celestial equator. Near-infrared observations from December 2014 show that  along with  display a similar spectrum to Elektra.

S/2014 (130) 2 
On 6 November 2021, astronomers A. Berdeu, M. Langlois, and F. Vachier reported the discovery of a third, closer-in satellite in archival VLT-SPHERE images taken between 9 and 31 December 2014, making Elektra the first quadruple system discovered and imaged in the main asteroid belt. This third satellite—which was provisionally designated —had eluded discovery when the images were taken, due to its faintness and close proximity to Elektra's bright glare. For these reasons,  had to be measured through image subtraction of Elektra's bright glare. The satellite has been identified in later VLT images from February 2016 and July-August 2019.

Notes

References

External links 
 First observation of a quadruple asteroid - Detection of a third moon around (130) Elektra, Anthony Berdeu, YouTube, 10 February 2022 (video presentation on the third satellite discovery)
 130 Elektra and S/2003 (130) 1, orbit data website maintained by F. Marchis. Includes adaptive optics image of primary, and satellite orbit diagram.
 Data on (130) Elektra from Johnston's archive (maintained by W. R. Johnston)
 Occultation Prediction Software (David Herald)
 
 

000130
Discoveries by Christian Peters
Named minor planets
000130
000130
000130
18730217